Richard Brabec (born 5 July 1966) is a Czech politician, who served as the minister for the Environment from 2014 to 2021, and deputy prime minister of the Czech Republic from 2017 to 2019.

Career
A former manager in the chemical industry (Unipetrol, Spolana Neratovice and Lovochemie), Brabec first entered the Chamber of Deputies in October 2013, elected for ANO 2011.

In January 2014, he became the Czech Minister for the Environment, in the government of Bohuslav Sobotka, and remained in this post under Prime Minister Andrej Babiš until December 2021. From December 2017 to April 2019 he served as the Deputy Prime Minister of the Czech Republic.

References 

1966 births
Politicians from Kladno
Environment ministers of the Czech Republic
Living people
ANO 2011 MPs
Civic Democratic Party (Czech Republic) politicians
Freedom Union – Democratic Union politicians
ANO 2011 Government ministers
Members of the Chamber of Deputies of the Czech Republic (2017–2021)
Members of the Chamber of Deputies of the Czech Republic (2013–2017)
Members of the Chamber of Deputies of the Czech Republic (2021–2025)